Abu Ja'far Muhammad (November 837 – 7 June 862), better known by his regnal title al-Muntasir bi-llah ("He who triumphs in God") was the caliph of the Abbasid Caliphate from 861 to 862, during the "Anarchy at Samarra".

Life

Al-Muntasir's mother was Hubshiya, a Greek slave.

Muhammad ibn Jarir al-Tabari records that in 236 AH (850 –851) al-Muntasir led a pilgrimage. The previous year al-Mutawakkil had named his three sons as heirs and seemed to favour al-Muntasir. However, afterwards this seemed to change and al-Muntasir feared his father was going to move against him. So, he decided to strike first. Al-Mutawakkil was killed by a Turkish soldier on Wednesday 10 December 861.

On the same day as the assassination, al-Muntasir succeeded smoothly to the throne of the Caliphate with the support of the Turkic faction. The Turkic party then prevailed on al-Muntasir to remove his brothers from the succession, fearing they would seek revenge for his involvement in the murder of their father. In their place, he was to appoint his son as heir apparent. On 27 April 862 both brothers wrote statements of abdication, although al-Mu'tazz did so after some hesitation.

Al-Muntasir became caliph on December 11, 861, after his father al-Mutawakkil was assassinated by members of his Turkic guard. Although he was suspected of being involved in the plot to kill al-Mutawakkil, he was able to quickly take control of affairs in the capital city of Samarra and receive the oath of allegiance from the leading men of the state. Al-Muntasir's sudden elevation to the Caliphate served to benefit several of his close associates, who gained senior positions in the government after his ascension. Included among these were his secretary, Ahmad ibn al-Khasib, who became vizier, and Wasif, a senior Turkic general who had likely been heavily involved in al-Mutawakkil's murder.

Al-Muntasir was lauded because, unlike his father, he loved the house of ʻAlī (Shīʻa) and removed the ban on pilgrimage to the tombs of Hassan and Hussayn. He sent Wasif to raid the Byzantines.

War with Byzantines
Shortly after securing his position as caliph, al-Muntasir decided to send an Abbasid army against the Byzantines. According to the historian al-Tabari, this decision was prompted by Ahmad ibn al-Khasib; the vizier had recently had a falling out with Wasif, and he sought to find an excuse to get him out of the capital. Ahmad ultimately decided that the best way to accomplish this was to put him at the head of a military campaign. He was eventually able to convince the caliph to go along with the plan, and al-Muntasir ordered Wasif to head to the Byzantine frontier.

Having completed their preparations for the campaign, Wasif and the army departed for the Byzantine frontier in early 862. Upon arriving at the Syrian side of the frontier zone, they set up camp there in preparation for their incursions into Byzantine territory.

Before Wasif had a chance to make any serious progress against the Byzantines, however, the campaign was overshadowed by events back at the capital. After a reign of only six months, al-Muntasir died around the beginning of June, of either illness or poison. Following his death, the vizir Ahmad ibn al-Khasib and a small group of senior Turkish commanders met and decided to appoint al-Musta'in as caliph in his stead. They presented their decision to the Samarran military regiments, and were eventually able to force the soldiers to swear allegiance to their candidate.

The death of al-Muntasir did not immediately result in the termination of the military campaign. Wasif, upon learning of the passing of the caliph, decided that he should still persist with the operation, and led his forces into Byzantine territory. The army advanced against a Byzantine fortress called Faruriyyah in the region of Tarsus. The defenders of the fortress were defeated and the stronghold was conquered by the Muslims.

Ultimately, however, the change of government in Samarra brought the expedition to a premature conclusion. The ascension of al-Musta'in could not be ignored indefinitely by Wasif; having already missed the opportunity to play a role in the selection of the new caliph, he needed to make sure his interests back in the capital were protected. As a result, he decided to abandon the Byzantine front, and by 863 he was back in Samarra.

Death

Al-Muntasir's reign lasted less than half a year; it ended with his death from unknown causes on Sunday, 7 June 862, at the age of 24 years (solar). There are various accounts of the illness that led to his death, including that he was bled with a poisoned lancet. Al-Tabari (p. 222-3) states that al-Muntasir is the first Abbasid whose tomb is known, that it was made public by his mother, a Greek slave-girl, and that earlier caliphs desired their tombs to be kept secret for fear of desecration. Joel L. Kraemer in his translation of al-Tabari notes on page 223:

"'Ayni comments, citing al-Sibt (b. al-Jawzi), that Tabari's statement here is surprising since the tombs of the Abbasid caliphs are in fact known, e.g., the tomb of al-Saffah is in Anbar beneath the minbar; and those of al-Mahdi in Masabadhan, Harun in Tus, al-Ma'mun in Tarsis, and al-Mu'tasim, al-Wathiq and al-Mu'tawakkil in Samarra."

See also
 al-Muhtadi, cousin of al-Muntasir
 al-Mu'tazz, brother of al-Muntasir
 al-Mu'tamid, brother of al-Muntasir
 al-Muwaffaq, brother of al-Muntasir
 al-Mu'ayyad, brother of al-Muntasir
 Ahmad ibn al-Khasib al-Jarjara'i, vizier of al-Muntasir

References

Bibliography 
 
 
 
William Muir, The Caliphate: Its Rise, Decline, and Fall.''

837 births
862 deaths
Arab Muslims
9th-century Abbasid caliphs
Arab people of Greek descent
Sons of Abbasid caliphs